15 de Septiembre was a Peru football club, located in the city of Trujillo, La Libertad. The club was founded with the name of Club 15 de Septiembre.

History
The club have played at the highest level of Peruvian football on three occasions, in the 1988 Torneo Descentralizado until 1990 Torneo Descentralizado when was relegated.

Honours

Regional
Liga Departamental de La Libertad: 0
Runner-up (1): 1987

See also
List of football clubs in Peru
Peruvian football league system

Football clubs in Peru